Lugiani Iván Gallardo Rodríguez (born 20 April 1991) is a Mexican former footballer.

Club career
Gallardo useed to play for South African club University of Pretoria.

Honours
Mexico U20
CONCACAF U-20 Championship: 2011
FIFA U-20 World Cup 3rd Place: 2011

External links

 https://archive.today/20130219044811/http://futbolvirtual.publimetro.com.mx/Players/Stats.aspx?playerId=33870

1991 births
Living people
Footballers from Mexico City
Association football wingers
Mexican footballers
Mexico under-20 international footballers
Club América footballers
Club Necaxa footballers
Tecos F.C. footballers
Albinegros de Orizaba footballers
Tlaxcala F.C. players
Club Atlético Zacatepec players
University of Pretoria F.C. players
Liga MX players